Albert Heffer (5 September 1933 – 3 September 2013) was a South African cricketer. He played one first-class match for Northerns in 1962/63.

References

External links
 

1933 births
2013 deaths
South African cricketers
Northerns cricketers
Cricketers from Pretoria